The 2016 Hong Kong Tennis Open (also known as the Prudential Hong Kong Tennis Open for sponsorship reasons) was a professional tennis tournament played on hard courts. It was the seventh edition of the tournament, and part of the 2016 WTA Tour. It took place in Victoria Park, Hong Kong, from October 10 to 16.

Points and prize money

Point distribution

Prize money

1 Qualifiers prize money is also the Round of 32 prize money
* per team

Singles main-draw entrants

Seeds

 1 Rankings are as of October 3, 2016

Other entrants
The following players received wildcards into the singles main draw:
 Başak Eraydın
 Lee Ya-hsuan
 Zhang Ling

The following players received entry from the qualifying draw:
 Marina Erakovic
 Dalila Jakupović
 Aleksandra Krunić
 Luksika Kumkhum
 Tereza Martincová
 Zhu Lin

Withdrawals
Before the tournament
  Mariana Duque Mariño → replaced by  Risa Ozaki
  Kristína Kučová → replaced by  Bethanie Mattek-Sands
  Yanina Wickmayer → replaced by  Maria Sakkari
During the tournament
  Johanna Konta

Doubles main-draw entrants

Seeds

1 Rankings are as of October 3, 2016

Other entrants 
The following pairs received wildcards into the doubles main draw:
  Ng Kwan-yau /  Zheng Saisai
  Eudice Chong /  Katherine Ip

Champions

Singles

 Caroline Wozniacki def.  Kristina Mladenovic, 6−1, 6–7(4–7), 6−2

Doubles

  Chan Hao-ching /  Chan Yung-jan def.  Naomi Broady /  Heather Watson, 6−3, 6–1

References

External links
Official site

Hong Kong Open (tennis)
Hong Kong Open (tennis)
2016 in Hong Kong sport
2016 in Chinese tennis